DC Thomson & Co Ltd v Deakin [1952] Ch 646 is a UK labour law case, concerning the right to strike.

Facts
NATSOPA wished to pressure on DC Thomson & Co Ltd to accept the union for collective bargaining. It got TGWU drivers to disrupt its supply of paper.

Judgment
Jenkins LJ, accepted the possibility of liability in principle of a union to an employer if a strike meant that a commercial contract would be cut off. However on the facts, there was not enough for liability.

See also

United Kingdom labour law

Notes

References

United Kingdom labour case law